The State Correctional Institution – Dallas, commonly referred to as SCI Dallas or Dallas The Pink Palace is a Pennsylvania Department of Corrections prison located in Luzerne County, Pennsylvania, United States. SCI Dallas houses about 2,140 inmates, some 400 of whom are serving life without the possibility of parole. It has 119 beds in its restricted housing unit (RHU). SCI Dallas was built to house 1,750 inmates.

History
According to the official Department of Corrections web site, SCI Dallas (Luzerne County, 10 miles from Wilkes-Barre) was opened in 1960 as an institution for defective delinquents. After the state Supreme Court decision of 1966 voided the concept of "defective delinquents," Dallas, like Huntingdon, became an adult institution. It now is a medium-security facility for men."

Notable prisoners 

 George Feigley, sex cult leader
Joseph Henry, convicted murderer
Harry "The Hunchback" Riccobene – mobster

See also 

 List of Pennsylvania state prisons

References

External links
SCI Dallas Site
PA Dept of Corrections Web site

Buildings and structures in Luzerne County, Pennsylvania
Dallas
1960 establishments in Pennsylvania